Laura Taylor may refer to:
 Laura Taylor (singer)
 Laura Taylor (swimmer)